The 2017 St. Louis mayoral election was held on April 4, 2017, to elect the mayor of St. Louis, Missouri. Incumbent Mayor Francis Slay chose not to run for reelection. Slay, who was serving his fourth term as mayor, indicated in March 2016 that he would run for reelection, but announced in April 2016 that he would not run for a fifth term. Primary elections took place on March 7, 2017, and the general election was held on April 4. Alderwoman Lyda Krewson was elected and became the first female Mayor of St. Louis.

Democratic primary

Candidates

Declared 
 Jeffrey Boyd, Alderman
 Antonio French, Alderman
 Bill Haas, school board member
 Tishaura Jones, City Treasurer and former state representative
 Lyda Krewson, Alderwoman
 Jimmie Matthews
 Lewis E. Reed, president of the board of aldermen and candidate for mayor in 2013

Withdrew 
 Sam Dotson, Commissioner of Police
 Jamilah Nasheed, state senator

Declined 
 Gregory F.X. Daly, Collector of Revenue
 Francis Slay, incumbent mayor

Endorsements

Polling

Republican primary

Candidates

Declared 
 Andrew Jones, utility executive
 Andy Karandzieff, owner of Crown Candy Kitchen
 Jim Osher, building owner

Withdrew 
 Umar Lee, activist

Libertarian primary 
 Robb Cunningham, former Congressional candidate

Green primary 
 Jonathan McFarland, former U.S. Senate candidate

Independent candidates 

 Tyrone Austin, small business owner
Kacey Cordes
 Rev. Larry Rice, founder of the New Life Evangelistic Center

Results

Results 

|-bgcolor="#EEEEEE"
| colspan="5" align="right" | Total
| align="right" | 58,303

References

Mayoral elections in St. Louis
St. Louis
St. Louis
2010s in St. Louis
St. Louis